William Warmwell (died 1423) was the member of the Parliament of England for Salisbury for multiple parliaments from February 1383 to 1395. He was also reeve, coroner, and mayor of Salisbury.

References 

Members of Parliament for Salisbury
English MPs February 1383
Year of birth unknown
1423 deaths
Mayors of Salisbury
Reeves (England)
British coroners
English MPs April 1384
English MPs January 1390
English MPs 1393
English MPs 1395